Volfas Engelman is an alcoholic beverages manufacturer in Kaunas, Lithuania.

The establishment of the brewery Volfas Engelman dates back to the 19th century. Today the brewery produces beer, cider, alcoholic mixed drinks, kvass and energy drinks. 
Volfas Engelman brewery is named after its two founders. Since 2012, the CEO of the company is Marius Horbačauskas. It has more than 230 employees, making Volfas Engelman the second-largest brewery in Lithuania.
At the moment 99.57 % of Volfas Engelman shares belong to the Finnish Olvi Company Group. Olvi was established in 1878 by the brewer Williams Gideon Åberg and his wife Onni. At present, it is the third-largest producer of beer, cider and soft drinks in Finland. In 1994, the brewery "Ragutis" was privatized and reorganized into a joint-stock company. In 1997, at the beginning, 51% of the shares of "Ragutis" were purchased by the Czech company "Pilsner Urquell". In 1997, the latter company transferred a strategic share package to the Estonian beer company "A. le Coq', operated by the Finnish company Olvi. In April 12, 2011, the brewery was returned to its historical name — "Volfas Engelman".

Brands

Beer
 "VOLFAS ENGELMAN" 
"1410" 
"HORN"
"FORTAS"

Cider
"FIZZ" 
"SHERWOOD"

Alcohol cocktails
"LE COQ" 
"G:N"

Kvass
"SMETONIŠKA GIRA" 
"VOLFAS ENGELMAN IMPERIAL GIRA"

Energy drinks
"DYNAMI:T"
"BCAA VITAMINERAL PERFORMANCE"

Soft drinks
"VOLFAS ENGELMAN FASSBRAUSE"
"KANE'S"
"AURA"
"SAKMĖ"

Works cited
Vilma Akmenytė, Giedrė Milerytė. Nuo I.B.Volfo ir Engelmano iki Ragučio. - K.:Kopa, 2008. —  208 p.: iliustr. —

References

Breweries in Lithuania
Companies based in Kaunas
Companies established in 1853
1853 establishments in the Russian Empire
Lithuanian brands
Drink companies of the Soviet Union
Companies nationalised by the Soviet Union